Orhan Kemal Cultural Centre, is a complex in the Çukurova district of Adana, that is composed of a theatre hall, three exhibition halls and a school of arts. The center is located next to the Çukurova Municipality Hall, on Türkmenbaşı Boulevard.
The cultural centre was opened in September 20, 2013 together with the City Hall and the Town Park. The centre was initially named the Çukurova Municipality Cultural Centre.
On January 7, 2015, the cultural center was renamed 'Orhan Kemal Kültür Merkezi' at the centennial of Orhan Kemal, one of the most productive Turkish novelists who died in 1970.

The Center
600-seater theatre hall  of the Center hosts the Çukurova Town Theatre and community theater groups. Çukurova Town Theatre performs every Tuesday here from October to May.

Turhan Selçuk School of Arts is a facility for learning photography, caricature and drawing.

References

Theatres in Adana
Buildings and structures in Adana